Chapel of the Good Shepherd is a historic Episcopal chapel located near Ridgeway, Warren County, North Carolina. It was built in 1871, and is a one-story, three bay by three bay, Gothic Revival style brick chapel.  It features a three-stage red-painted wooden entrance tower with a concave pyramidal roof.

It was added to the National Register of Historic Places in 1977.

References

Episcopal church buildings in North Carolina
Chapels in the United States
Churches on the National Register of Historic Places in North Carolina
Gothic Revival church buildings in North Carolina
Churches completed in 1871
19th-century Episcopal church buildings
Buildings and structures in Warren County, North Carolina
National Register of Historic Places in Warren County, North Carolina